DYU is a three-letter acronym with the meanings:

 Dayeh University, a university in Taiwan
 Design Your Universe, an album by Epica
 Dushanbe Airport, an airport in Tajikistan
 Dingyuan railway station, China Railway pinyin code DYU